The Irkut (Buryat and , Erhüü gol) is a river in the Buryat Republic and Irkutsk Oblast of Russia. It is a left tributary of the Angara. It flows out of lake Ilchir which is situated 50 km away from the highest peak of the Eastern Sayan Mountains, Munku-Sardyk. The Irkut freezes up in late October or mid-November and stays icebound until late April or early May. The city of Irkutsk is located at the mouth of the Irkut on the Angara.

References

Rivers of Irkutsk Oblast
Rivers of Buryatia